, a type of donburi, is a Japanese rice dish topped with thin-sliced raw tuna sashimi. Spicy tekkadon is made with what can be a mix of spicy ingredients, a spicy orange sauce, or both, usually incorporating spring onions.

The term tekka in the name derives from the gambling rooms (tekkaba) where the dish was commonly served from the end of the Edo period to the start of the Meiji period of Japan's history.

Variations
A similar dish made with salmon sashimi is called sakedon.

See also
 Donburi
 Katsudon
 List of fish dishes
 List of tuna dishes
 Sushi

References

Donburi
Japanese cuisine
Japanese rice dishes
Tuna dishes
Salmon dishes
Uncooked fish dishes
Seafood and rice dishes